De Heer is a Dutch surname, meaning "the gentleman / lord". The variant forms d'Heer and De Heere are now (nearly) extinct in the Netherlands. People with the name include:

De Heer
Jack de Heer (born 1953), Canadian-born Dutch ice hockey player
 (1829–1904), Dutch checkers and chess player
Margaretha de Heer (1603–1665), Dutch painter
Rolf de Heer (born 1951), Dutch-born Australian film director
Walter de Heer (born 1949), Dutch experimental physicist 
De Heere
Gerrit de Heere (1657–1702), Dutch Governor of Ceylon 
Lucas de Heere or Lucas 'd'Heere (1534–1584), Flemish portrait painter, poet and writer

See also
De Heere or "Heerestraat", original name of Manhattan's Broadway

References

Dutch-language surnames